Reinhold Andreas Messner (born 17 September 1944) is an Italian mountaineer, explorer, and author from South Tyrol. He made the first solo ascent of Mount Everest and, along with Peter Habeler, the first ascent of Everest without supplemental oxygen. Messner was the first to cross Antarctica and Greenland with neither snowmobiles nor dog sleds. He also crossed the Gobi Desert alone. He is widely considered one of the greatest mountaineers of all time.

From 1999 to 2004, Messner served as a member of the European Parliament for north-east Italy, as a member of the Federation of the Greens.

Messner has published more than 80 books about his experiences as a climber and explorer. In 2010, he received the 2nd Piolet d'Or Lifetime Achievement Award.  In 2018, he received jointly with Krzysztof Wielicki the Princess of Asturias Award in the category of Sports.

Early life and education

Messner was born to a German-speaking family settled in St. Peter, Villnöß, near Brixen in South Tyrol, which is part of Northern Italy. According to his sister, his delivery was difficult as he was a large baby and the birth took place during an air raid. His mother Maria (1913–1995) was the daughter of a shop owner and 4 years older than her husband. His father Josef (1917–1985) was drafted to serve the German army and participated in World War II on the Russian front. After the war, he was an auxiliary teacher until 1957, when he became the director of the local school. Messner was the second of nine children – Helmut (born 1943), Günther (1946–1970), Erich (born 1948), Waltraud (born 1949), Siegfried (1950–1985), Hubert (born 1953), Hansjörg (born 1955) and Werner (born 1957), and grew up in modest means.

Messner spent his early years climbing in the Alps and falling in love with the Dolomites. His father was strict and sometimes severe with him. He led Reinhold to his first summit at the age of five.

When Messner was 13, he began climbing with his brother Günther, age 11. By the time Reinhold and Günther were in their early twenties, they were among Europe's best climbers.

Since the 1960s, Messner, inspired by Hermann Buhl, was one of the first and most enthusiastic supporters of alpine style mountaineering in the Himalayas, which consisted of climbing with very light equipment and a minimum of external help. Messner considered the usual expedition style ("siege tactics") disrespectful toward nature and mountains.

Career
Before his first major Himalayan climb in 1970, Messner had made a name for himself mainly through his achievements in the Alps. Between 1960 and 1964, he led over 500 ascents, most of them in the Dolomites. In 1965, he climbed a new direttissima route on the north face of the Ortler. A year later, he climbed the Walker Spur on the Grandes Jorasses and ascended the Rocchetta Alta di Bosconero. In 1967, he made the first ascent of the northeast face of the Agnér and the first winter ascents of the Agnér north face and Furchetta north face.

In 1968, he achieved further firsts: the Heiligkreuzkofel middle pillar and the direct south face of the Marmolada. In 1969, Messner joined an Andes expedition, during which he succeeded, together with Peter Habeler, in making the first ascent of the Yerupaja east face up to the summit ridge and, a few days later, the first ascent of the  Yerupaja Chico. He also made the first solo ascent of the Droites north face, the Philipp-Flamm intersection on the Civetta and the south face of Marmolada di Rocca. As a result, Messner won the reputation of being one of the best climbers in Europe.

In 1970, Messner was invited to join a major Himalayan expedition that was going to attempt the unclimbed Rupal face of Nanga Parbat. The expedition, which was the major turning point in his life, turned out to be a tragic success. Both he and his brother Günther reached the summit but Günther died two days later on the descent of the Diamir face. Reinhold lost seven toes, which had become badly frostbitten during the climb and required amputation. Reinhold was severely criticized for persisting on this climb with the less experienced Günther. The 2010 movie Nanga Parbat by Joseph Vilsmaier is based on his account of the events.

While Messner and Peter Habeler were noted for fast ascents in the Alps of the Eiger North Wall, standard route (10 hours) and Les Droites (8 hours), his 1975 Gasherbrum I first ascent of a new route took three days. This was unheard of at the time.

In the 1970s, Messner championed the cause for ascending Mount Everest without supplementary oxygen, saying that he would do it "by fair means" or not at all. In 1978, he reached the summit of Everest with Habeler. This was the first time anyone had been that high without supplemental oxygen and Messner and Habeler achieved what certain doctors, specialists, and mountaineers thought impossible. He repeated the feat, without Habeler, from the Tibetan side in 1980, during the monsoon season. This was Everest's first solo summit.

In 1978, he made a solo ascent of the Diamir face of Nanga Parbat. In 1986, Messner became the first to complete all fourteen eight-thousanders (peaks over 8,000 metres above sea level).

Messner has crossed Antarctica on skis, together with fellow explorer Arved Fuchs.
He has written over 80 books about his experiences, a quarter of which have been translated. He was featured in the 1984 film The Dark Glow of the Mountains by Werner Herzog. 
From 1999 to 2004, he held political office as a Member of the European Parliament for the Italian Green Party (Federazione dei Verdi). He was also among the founders of Mountain Wilderness, an international NGO dedicated to the protection of mountains worldwide.

In 2004 he completed a  expedition through the Gobi desert.
In 2006, he founded the Messner Mountain Museum.

Expeditions

Ascents above 8,000m 
Messner was the first person to climb all fourteen eight-thousanders in the world and without supplemental oxygen. His climbs were also all amongst the first 20 ascents for each mountain individually. Specifically, these are:

Other expeditions since 1970 

 1971 – Journeys to the mountains of Persia, Nepal, New Guinea, Pakistan and East Africa;
 1972 – Noshak in the Hindu Kush;
 1973 – Marmolada West Pillar, first climb; Furchetta West Face, first climb;
 1974 – Aconcagua south wall, partially new "South Tyrol Route"; Eiger North Face with Peter Habeler in 10 hours (a record that stood for 34 years, for a roped party);
 1976 – Mount McKinley, "Face of the Midnight Sun", first climb;
 1978 – Kilimanjaro, "Breach Wall", first climb;
 1979 – Ama Dablam rescue attempt; first climbs in the Hoggar Mountains, Africa;
 1981 – Chamlang Centre Summit-North Face, first climb;
 1984 – Double-Traverse of Gasherbrum II and I with Hans Kammerlander;
 1985 – Tibet Transversale with Kailash exploration;
 1986 – Crossing of East Tibet; Mount Vinson (Antarctic), on 3 December 1986, thus becoming the first person to complete Seven Summits without the use of supplemental oxygen on Mount Everest;
 1987 – Bhutan trip; Pamir trip;
 1988 – Yeti-Tibet solo expedition;
 1989–1990 – Antarctic crossing (over the South Pole) on foot,  trek with Arved Fuchs;
 1991 – Bhutan crossing (east-west); "Around South Tyrol" as a positioning exercise, where he was peripherally involved in the Ötzi find, being among the groups who inspected the mummy on-site the day after its initial discovery;
 1992 – Ascent of Chimborazo; crossing of Taklamakan Desert in Xinjiang;
 1993 – Trip to Dolpo, Mustang and Manang in Nepal; Greenland longitudinal crossing (diagonal) on foot,  trek;
 1994 – Cleaning project in North India/Gangotri, Shivling region; to Ruwenzori, Uganda;
 1995 – Arctic crossing (Siberia to Canada) failed; trip to Belukha, Altai Mountains/Siberia;
 1996 – Trip through East Tibet and to Kailash.
 1997 – Trip to Kham (East Tibet); small expedition into Karakoram; filming on the Ol Doinyo Lengai (holy mountain of the Maasai) in Tanzania
 1998  – Trip to the Altai Mountains (Mongolia) and to Puna de Atacama (Andes)
 1999 – Filming: San Francisco Peaks, Arizona (Holy mountain of Navajo); trip into the Thar Desert/India
 2000 – Crossing of South Georgia on the Shackleton Route; Nanga Parbat Expedition; filming on Mount Fuji/Japan for the ZDF series Wohnungen der Götter (~"Homes of the Gods")
 2001  – Dharamsala and foothills of the Himalayas/India; ZDF series Wohnungen der Götter on Gunung Agung/Bali
 2002 – In the "International Year of the Mountains" visit by mountaineers into the Andes and ascent of Cotopaxi, Ecuador
 2003 – Trekking to Mount Everest (fiftieth anniversary of the first successful climb); trip to Franz Joseph Land/Arctic; on 1 October opening of the "Günther Mountain School" in the Diamir Valley on Nanga Parbat/Pakistan
 2004 – Longitudinal crossing of the Gobi Desert (Mongolia) on foot, about  trek
 2005 – Trip to the Dyva Nomads in Mongolia; "time journey" around Nanga Parbat/Pakistan

Climbs

Nanga Parbat 
Reinhold Messner took a total of five expeditions to Nanga Parbat. In 1970 and 1978 he reached the summit (in 1978 solo); in 1971, 1973 and 1977, he did not. In 1971 he was primarily looking for his brother's remains.

Rupal Face 1970 

In May and June 1970, Messner took part in the Nanga Parbat South Face expedition led by Karl Herrligkoffer, the objective of which was to climb the as yet unclimbed Rupal Face, the highest rock and ice face in the world. Messner's brother, Günther, was also a member of the team. On the morning of 27 June, Messner was of the view that the weather would deteriorate rapidly, and set off alone from the last high-altitude camp. Surprisingly his brother climbed after him and caught up to him before the summit. By late afternoon, both had reached the summit of the mountain and had to pitch an emergency bivouac shelter without tent, sleeping bags and stoves because darkness was closing in.

The events that followed have been the subject of years of legal actions and disputes between former expedition members, and have still not been finally resolved. What is known now is that Reinhold and Günther Messner descended the Diamir Face, thereby achieving the first traverse of Nanga Parbat and second traverse of an eight-thousander after Mount Everest in 1963. Reinhold arrived in the valley six days later with severe frostbite, but survived. His brother, Günther, however died on the Diamir Face—according to Reinhold Messner on the same descent, during which they became further and further separated from each other. As a result, the time, place and exact cause of death is unknown. Messner said his brother had been swept away by an avalanche.

In June 2005, after an unusual heat wave on the mountain, the body of his brother was recovered on the Diamir Face, which seems to support Messner's account of how Günther died.

The drama was turned into a film Nanga Parbat (2010) by Joseph Vilsmaier, based on the memories of Reinhold Messner and without participation from the other former members of the expedition. Released in January 2010 in cinemas, the film was criticised by the other members of the team for telling only one side of the story.

Because of severe frostbite, especially on his feet—seven toes were amputated—Messner was not able to climb quite as well on rock after the 1970 expedition. He therefore turned his attention to higher mountains, where there was much more ice.

Solo climb in 1978 
On 9 August 1978, after three unsuccessful expeditions, Messner reached the summit of Nanga Parbat again via the Diamir Face.

Manaslu 
In 1972, Messner succeeded in climbing Manaslu on what was then the unknown south face of the mountain, of which there were not even any pictures. From the last high-altitude camp he climbed with Frank Jäger, who turned back before reaching the summit. Shortly after Messner reached the summit, the weather changed and heavy fog and snow descended. Initially Messner became lost on the way down, but later, heading into the storm, found his way back to the camp, where Horst Fankhauser and Andi Schlick were waiting for him and Jäger. Jäger did not return, although his cries were heard from the camp. Orientation had become too difficult. Fankhauser and Schlick began to search for him that evening, but lost their way and sought shelter at first in a snow cave. Messner himself was no longer in a position to help the search. The following day, only Horst Fankhauser returned. Andi Schlick had left the snow cave during the night and disappeared. Thus, the expedition had to mourn the loss of two climbers. Messner was later criticised for having allowed Jäger go back down the mountain alone.

Gasherbrum I 
Together with Peter Habeler, Messner made a second ascent of Gasherbrum I on 10 August 1975, becoming the first man ever to climb more than two eight-thousanders. It was the first time a mountaineering expedition succeeded in scaling an eight-thousander using alpine style climbing. Until that point, all fourteen 8000-meter peaks had been summitted using the expedition style, though Hermann Buhl had earlier advocated "West Alpine Style" (similar to "capsule" style, with a smaller group relying on minimal fixed ropes).

Messner reached the summit again in 1984, this time together with Hans Kammerlander. This was achieved as part of a double ascent where, for the first time, two eight-thousander peaks (Gasherbrum I and II) were climbed without returning to base camp. Again, this was done in alpine style, i.e. without the pre-location of stores. Filmmaker Werner Herzog accompanied the climbers along the  approach to base camp, interviewing them extensively about why they were making the climb, if they could say; they could not. Messner became emotional on camera when he recalled having to tell his mother about his brother's death.

It took a week for the two climbers to summit both peaks and return to camp, after which Herzog interviewed them again. His documentary, The Dark Glow of the Mountains, with some footage the two climbers shot during the expedition on portable cameras, was released the following year.

Mount Everest 

On 8 May 1978, Reinhold Messner and Peter Habeler reached the summit of Mount Everest, becoming the first man known to climb it without the use of supplemental oxygen. Before this ascent, it was disputed whether this was possible at all. Messner and Habeler were members of an expedition led by Wolfgang Nairz along the southeast ridge to the summit. Also on this expedition was Reinhard Karl, the first German to reach the summit, albeit with the aid of supplemental oxygen.

Two years later, on 20 August 1980, Messner again stood atop the highest mountain in the world, without supplementary oxygen. For this solo climb, he chose the northeast ridge to the summit, where he crossed above the North Col in the North Face to the Norton Couloir and became the first man to climb through this steep gorge to the summit. Messner decided spontaneously during the ascent to use this route to bypass the exposed northeast ridge. Before this solo ascent, he had not set up a camp on the mountain. When he returned he was nearly dead and the medical team who met him at the bottom of the mountain asked him, "why would you go up there to die?" and Messner replied, "I went up there to live."

K2

For 1979, Messner was planning to climb K2 on a new direct route through the South Face, which he called the "Magic Line". Headed by Messner, the small expedition consisted of six climbers: Italians Alessandro Gogna, Friedl Mutschlechner and Renato Casarotto; the Austrian, Robert Schauer; and Germans Michael Dacher, journalist, Jochen Hölzgen, and doctor Ursula Grether, who was injured during the approach and had to be carried to Askole by Messner and Mutschlechner. Because of avalanche danger on the original route and time lost on the approach, they decided to climb via the Abruzzi Spur. The route was equipped with fixed ropes and high-altitude camps, but no hauling equipment (Hochträger) or bottled oxygen was used. On 12 July, Messner and Dacher reached the summit; then the weather deteriorated and attempts by other members of the party failed.

Shishapangma 
During his stay in Tibet as part of his Everest solo attempt, Messner explored Shishapangma. A year later, Messner, with Friedel Mutschlechner, Oswald Oelz, and Gerd Baur, set up a base camp on the north side. On 28 May, Messner and Mutschlechner reached the summit in very bad weather; part of the climb involving ski mountaineering.

Kangchenjunga 

In 1982, Messner wanted to become the first climber ever to scale three eight-thousanders in one year. He was planning to climb Kangchenjunga, then Gasherbrum II and the Broad Peak.

Messner chose a new variation of the route up the north face. Because there was still a lot of snow, Messner and Mutschlechner made very slow progress. In addition, the difficulty of the climb forced the two mountaineers to use fixed ropes. Finally, on 6 May, Messner and Mutschlechner stood on the summit. There, Mutschlechner suffered frostbite to his hands, and later to his feet as well. While bivouacking during the descent, the tent tore away from Mutschlechner and Messner, and Messner also fell ill. He was suffering from amoebic liver abscess, making him very weak. He made it back to base camp only with Mutschlechner's help.

Gasherbrum II 
After his ascent of Kangchenjunga, Mutschlechner flew back to Europe because his frostbite had to be treated and Messner needed rest. Thus the three mountains could not be climbed as planned. Messner was cured of his amoebic liver abscess and then travelled to Gasherbrum II, but could not use the new routes as planned. In any case, his climbing partners, Sher Khan and Nazir Sabir, would not have been strong enough. Nevertheless, all three reached the summit on 24 July in a storm. During the ascent, Messner discovered the body of a previously missing Austrian mountaineer, whom he buried two years later at the G I – G II traverse.

Broad Peak 

In 1982, Messner scaled Broad Peak, his third eight-thousander. At the time, he was the only person with a permit to climb this mountain; he came across Jerzy Kukuczka and Wojciech Kurtyka, who had permits to climb K2, but used its geographic proximity to climb Broad Peak illegally. In early descriptions of the ascent, Messner omitted this encounter, but he referred to it several years later. On 2 August, Messner was reunited with Nazir Sabir and Khan again on the summit. The three mountaineers had decamped and made for Broad Peak immediately after their ascent of Gasherbrum II. The climb was carried out with a variation from the normal route at the start.

Cho Oyu 
In the winter of 1982–83, Messner attempted the first winter ascent of Cho Oyu. This expedition was his first with Hans Kammerlander. A few months later, on 5 May, he reached the summit via a partially new route together with Kammerlander and Michael Dacher.

Annapurna 
In 1985, Messner topped out on Annapurna. Using a new route on the northwest face, he reached the summit with Kammerlander on 24 April. Also on the expedition were Reinhard Patscheider, Reinhard Schiestl and Swami Prem Darshano, who did not reach the summit. During Messner and Kammerlander's ascent, the weather was bad and they had to be assisted by the other three expedition members during the descent due to heavy snowfall.

Dhaulagiri 

Messner had already attempted Dhaulagiri in 1977 and 1984, unsuccessfully. In 1985 he finally summited. He climbed with Kammerlander up the normal route along the northeast ridge. After only three days of climbing they stood on the summit in a heavy storm on 15 May.

Makalu 
Messner tried climbing Makalu four times. He failed in 1974 and 1981 on the South Face of the south-east ridge. In winter 1985–1986 he attempted the first winter ascent of Makalu via the normal route. Even this venture did not succeed. Not until February 2009 was Makalu successfully climbed in winter by Denis Urubko and Simone Moro.

In 1986, Messner returned and succeeded in reaching the summit using the normal route with Kammerlander and Mutschlechner. Although they had turned back twice during this expedition, they made the summit on the third attempt on 26 September. During this expedition, Messner witnessed the death of Marcel Rüedi, for whom the Makalu was his 9th eight-thousander. Rüedi was on the way back from the summit and was seen by Messner and the other climbers on the descent. Although he was making slow progress, he appeared to be safe. The tea for his reception had already been boiled when Rüedi disappeared behind a snow ridge and did not reappear. He was found dead a short time later.

Lhotse 
Messner climbed his last normal route. Messner and Kammerlander had to contend with a strong wind in the summit area. To reach the summit that year and before winter broke, they took a direct helicopter flight from the Makalu base camp to the Lhotse base camp.

Thus Messner became the first person to climb all eight-thousanders. 
Since this ascent, Messner has never climbed another eight-thousander. 
In 1989, Messner led a European expedition to the South Face of the mountain. The aim was to forge a path up the as-yet-unclimbed face. Messner himself did not want to climb any more. The expedition was unsuccessful.

The Seven Summits
In 1985 Richard Bass first postulated and achieved the mountaineering challenge Seven Summits, climbing the highest peaks of each of the seven continents. Messner suggested another list (the Messner or Carstensz list) replacing Mount Kosciuszko with Indonesia's Puncak Jaya, or Carstensz Pyramid. From a mountaineering point of view the Messner list is the more challenging one. Climbing Carstensz Pyramid has the character of an expedition, whereas the ascent of Kosciuszko is an easy hike. In May 1986 Pat Morrow became the first person to complete the Messner list, followed by Messner himself when he climbed Mount Vinson in December 1986 to become the second.

World-first records
Messner is listed nine times in the Guinness Book of Records. All of his achievements are classed as "World's Firsts" (or "Historical Firsts"). A "World's First" is the highest category of any Guinness World Record, meaning the ownership of the title never expires. As of 2021, Messner is the second highest record holder of "World's Firsts" (after Icelandic explorer Fiann Paul, who has 13). Messner's world firsts are:

 First ascent of Manaslu without supplementary oxygen
 First solo summit of Everest
 First ascent of Everest and K2 without supplementary oxygen – male
 First ascent of the top three highest mountains without supplementary oxygen – male
 First 8,000-metre mountain hat-trick
 First person to climb all 8,000-metre mountains without supplementary oxygen
 First person to climb all 8,000-metre mountains
 First ascent of Everest without supplementary oxygen
 First ascent of Gasherbrum I without supplementary oxygen

Messner Mountain Museum 

In 2003 Messner started work on a project for a mountaineering museum. On 11 June 2006, the Messner Mountain Museum (MMM) opened, a museum that unites within one museum the stories of the growth and decline of mountains, culture in the Himalayan region and the history of South Tyrol.

The MMM consists of five or six locations:

 MMM Firmian at Sigmundskron Castle near Bozen is the centerpiece of the museum and concentrates on man's relationship with the mountains. Surrounded by peaks from the Schlern and the Texel range, the MMM Firmian provides visitors with a series of pathways, stairways, and towers containing displays that focus on the geology of the mountains, the religious significance of mountains in the lives of people, and the history of mountaineering and alpine tourism. The so-called white tower is dedicated to the history of the village and the struggle for the independence of South Tyrol.
 MMM Juval at Juval Castle in the Burggrafenamt in Vinschgau is dedicated to the "magic of the mountains", with an emphasis on mystical mountains, such as Mount Kailash or Ayers Rock and their religious significance. MMM Juval houses several art collections.
 MMM Dolomites, known as the Museum in the Clouds, is located at Monte Rite between Pieve di Cadore and Cortina d'Ampezzo. Housed in an old fort, this museum is dedicated to the subject of rocks, particularly in the Dolomites, with exhibits focusing on the history of the formation of the Dolomites. The summit observation platform offers a 360° panorama of the surrounding Dolomites, with views toward Monte Schiara, Monte Agnèr, Monte Civetta, Marmolada, Monte Pelmo, Tofana di Rozes, Sorapis, Antelao, Marmarole.
 MMM Ortles at Sulden on the Ortler is dedicated to the theme of ice. The museum contains the world's largest collection of paintings of the Ortler, as well as ice-climbing gear from two centuries.
 MMM Ripa at Brunico Castle in South Tyrol is dedicated to the mountain peoples from Asia, Africa, South America and Europe, with emphasis on their cultures, religions, and tourism activities.
 MMM Corones, opened in July 2015 on the top of the Kronplatz mountain (Plan de Corones in Italian), is dedicated to traditional climbing.

Political career 

In 1999, Messner was elected Member of the European Parliament for the Federation of the Greens (FdV), the Italian green party, receiving more than 20,000 votes in the European election. He fully served his term until 2004, when he retired from politics.

Messner was officially a member of South Tyrolean Greens, a regionalist and ecologist political party active only in South Tyrol, which de facto acts as a regional branch of the FdV.

Electoral history

Personal life
From 1972 until 1977, Messner was married to Uschi Demeter. With his partner, Canadian photographer Nena Holguin, he has a daughter, Làyla Messner, born in 1981. On 31 July 2009, he married his long time girlfriend Sabine Stehle, a textile designer from Vienna, with whom he has three children.
They divorced in 2019. In late May 2021, Messner married Diane Schumacher, a 41-year-old Luxembourgish woman living in Munich, at the town hall in Kastelbell-Tschars near his home in South Tyrol.

In media 
The Dark Glow of the Mountains (Gasherbrum – Der Leuchtende Berg), a 1985 Werner Herzog television documentary
 Portrait of a Snow Lion, a BBC/France3 1992 documentary on Messner; part 4 of the series The Climbers
 Messner, a 2002 feature documentary about Messner by Les Guthman
 Lissi und der wilde Kaiser, an animated comedy movie from 2007 by Michael Herbig ends with a photo of the Yeti with his new buddy, Reinhold Messner.
 Nanga Parbat, a 2010 film based on Messner's achievements
 The Unauthorized Biography of Reinhold Messner, a 1999 album by Ben Folds Five, unrelated to Messner
14 Peaks: Nothing Is Impossible, a 2021 Netflix documentary film about Nirmal Purja and his mountaineering team's world record breaking ascent of the 14 highest mountains in the world. Reinhold Messner provides commentary in several interview segments. The New York Times described his contribution to the film as "the alpine legend Reinhold Messner waxing beautifully existential".

See also 
List of climbers

References

Selected bibliography (English translations)

Sources

Further reading

External links

 Official site 
 Discovery of remains ends controversy about the death of Reinhold Messner's brother
 
  Reinhold Messner on the Future of Climbing Mount Everest - an interview with Saransh Sehgal

Interviews
 Gaia Symphony Documentary series (Japanese production).
 Reinhold Messner Biography and Interview on American Academy of Achievement.

Italian explorers
Italian mountain climbers
Federation of the Greens MEPs
Living people
Cryptozoologists
Free soloists
Summiters of the Seven Summits
Summiters of all 14 eight-thousanders
Germanophone Italian people
People from Brixen
MEPs for Italy 1999–2004
20th-century Italian politicians
21st-century Italian politicians
Year of birth missing (living people)
Politicians of South Tyrol
Recipients of the Royal Geographical Society Patron's Medal
Piolet d'Or winners